Sir Archibald Montague Henry Gray (1 February 1880 – 13 October 1967), was a dermatologist and consulting physician for diseases of the skin at University College Hospital and to the Great Ormond Street Hospital. Between 1948 and I962, he was adviser in dermatology to the Ministry of Health.

References 

1880 births
1967 deaths
British dermatologists
Presidents of the Royal Society of Medicine